El Assa Airfield is an abandoned World War II military airfield located in the district of Nuqat al Khams, Libya. It is about 140 km west of Tripoli near the Tunisian border.

The facility was built either by the Italian Regia Aeronautica or German Luftwaffe about 1941.   After the seizure of the area by the British Eighth Army during the Western Desert Campaign in early 1943, it was used by the Ninth Air Force of the United States Army Air Force's 83d Bombardment Squadron (12th Bombardment Group) between 3  March and 4 April 1943.  The 83d flew  B-25 Mitchell medium bombers from the airfield.

The airfield most likely was constructed from compacted sand with tents being used as support facilities.  Today it is unrecognizable, being taken over by the desert.

References

 Maurer, Maurer. Air Force Combat Units of World War II. Maxwell AFB, Alabama: Office of Air Force History, 1983. .

External links

Airfields of the United States Army Air Forces in Libya
World War II airfields in Libya
Airports established in 1941